Charles-Léonce Brossé (1871–1945), also known as Bsor or Bzor, was a French painter; engraver and lithographer. 

He is most well known for his poster "Meeting d'Aviation Nice," promoting an early "aviation meeting" or air show held in Nice, France, April 10–25, 1910. The poster depicts a pilot scattering roses from his airplane flying high over the Nice coast. Notice the shape of the left wing is mirrored in the shape of the water above and below the right wing. The lettering at the top is in a distinct Art Nouveau style and surrounds a crowned red eagle, representing the arms of Nice, with exaggerated wings extending far beyond the shield and resembling the wings of an airplane. The poster has been credited with contributing to "Nice’s glamorous image." It has been reprinted numerous times and also has  been reproduced on coffee mugs and other objects. 

Brossé also designed bookplates, including one in 1912 for the alpinist Spitalieri.

References

1871 births
French illustrators
Air shows
Aviation in France
Art Nouveau illustrators
1945 deaths